is a Japanese tokusatsu drama and the 28th entry of Toei Company's Kamen Rider metaseries. It is the nineteenth series to debut during the Heisei era. The show premiered on September 3, 2017, following the finale of Kamen Rider Ex-Aid, joining Uchu Sentai Kyuranger and later, Kaitou Sentai Lupinranger VS Keisatsu Sentai Patranger in the Super Hero Time line-up.

Summary

A cataclysmic event involving an artifact of an ancient Martian civilization has created a supernatural barrier called the Skywall which separates Japan into three territories, Touto, Hokuto, and Seito. Along with creating a complex power dynamic between the three regions, the event brings waves of monsters called Smash down on the country, who terrorize and attack the citizens.

The protagonist, Sento Kiryu, is an amnesiac taken in by a mysterious cafe owner named Soichi Isurugi who provides him with a belt called the Build Driver that allows him to turn into Kamen Rider Build, which he uses to fight the Smash on his own. Build has different powers determined by the combination of a pair of Fullbottles inserted into the belt, each containing the essences of organic and inorganic matters. Full bottles are obtained by defeating the Smash and absorbing their essence into a Fullbottle and then purifying it.

Throughout the story, Sento learns that his forgotten past is connected to the events of the Skywall Catastrophe, that the Smash is the work of a larger organization attempting to rule the world, and that his allies are not what they seem. In his search for the truth about his past and a solution to the crisis, Sento makes several allies who also gain the ability to transform and fight with him, encounters several nemeses who brutally push back at his attempts to save humanity, and is forced to question who is on what side, and what the sides even are.

Production

The Kamen Rider Build trademark was registered by Toei on May 18, 2017. A press conference was later held on August 1, 2017 to reveal the cast and crew, plot details, the suit and bike of Kamen Rider Build. A trailer was also shown and later released on Youtube later that same day.

Suit design
The motif of Kamen Rider Build's main form was "rabbit" and "tank". The motif of the form was suggested by Takahito Omori, who found the combination interesting.

One of the villains, Night Rogue, has their suit recolored for Kamen Rider MadRogue, which appeared from episode 38 onwards.

The monsters of the series is called "Smash". They were designed in a way so that their motif are not immediately obvious in order to surprise the audiences when their essence was captured by the main characters after their defeat.

Episodes

Similar to the previous series, half of each episode's title is an English word, though spelled in katakana instead of English letters, and the other is written in kanji. Also, each episode briefly shows mathematics and/or physics formulas, which forms the episode number.

Every episode of the series were written by Shogo Muto.

Films
Kamen Rider Build made his debut as a cameo in Kamen Rider Ex-Aid the Movie: True Ending, prior to his first chronological debut in episode 44 of Kamen Rider Ex-Aid.

Heisei Generations Final

A Movie War film, titled  was released on December 9, 2017. Aside from the casts of Kamen Rider Build and Kamen Rider Ex-Aid, Shu Watanabe and Ryosuke Miura (Kamen Rider OOO), Sota Fukushi, Shion Tsuchiya and Takushi Tanaka (Kamen Rider Fourze), Gaku Sano (Kamen Rider Gaim), and Shun Nishime and Takayuki Yanagi (Kamen Rider Ghost) returned to reprise their respective roles. The musician and writer Kenji Ohtsuki portrayed the main antagonist of the movie, Mogami Kaisei/Kaiser. The events of the movie took place between episodes 14 and 15.

Be the One

 was released in Japan on August 4, 2018, double billed with the film for Kaitou Sentai Lupinranger VS Keisatsu Sentai Patranger. Actors Masanobu Katsumura, Takashi Fujii, and Rena Matsui portrayed the main antagonists of the movie. It also featured a cameo appearance of Build's titular successor, Kamen Rider Zi-O, before his proper debut in his own series. The events of the movie took place between episodes 45 and 46.

Heisei Generations Forever

A Movie War film, titled  was released on December 22, 2018, featuring the casts of Kamen Rider Build and Kamen Rider Zi-O along with Kamen Rider Den-O. The events of the film took place after the end of the main series.

Special episodes
 is Televi-Kuns . It took place between episodes 19 and 20.
 is a web-exclusive series released on Toei's official YouTube channel. It comprises three episodes, but the final episode is exclusive to the DVD. The first and second episode took place during episode 21 and the last episode took place a month later.
Rogue is a spin-off miniseries included in the blu-ray collection of Kamen Rider Build. It comprises three episodes and is a side story focusing on Gentoku Himuro. The first episode took place three years prior to the main series, and the second and final episodes took place after Episode 20.
Night Rogue Rises: Released as part of Kamen Rider Build Blu-ray Collection Volume 1.
Dark Night Fall: Released as part of Kamen Rider Build Blu-ray Collection Volume 2.
Kamen Rider Rogue: Released as part of Kamen Rider Build Blu-ray Collection Volume 3.
 is Televi-Kuns "Hyper Battle DVD". It takes place between episodes 41 and 42.
 is a side story featuring Kazumi Sawatari. It serves as a prequel to Build New World: Kamen Rider Grease and was released alongside Grease.

Build New World
 is a set of two V-Cinema releases that are written by Shogo Muto and serve as spin-offs of characters from the Kamen Rider Build series. The events of the V-Cinemas take place after the end of the main series.
 focuses on a side story of Ryuga Banjo. The V-Cinema is directed by Kyohei Yamaguchi and was released on April 24, 2019. The theme song is "CROSS" performed by J-CROWN & TaKu.
 focuses on a side story of Kazumi Sawatari. The V-Cinema is directed by Shojiro Nakazawa and was released on November 27, 2019. The theme song is "Perfect Triumph" performed by Masanori Kobayashi (WAЯROCK).

Other media
 is a stageshow that serves as an epilogue for the series.
, written by Shogo Muto and Takahito Ōmori, is part of a series of spin-off novel adaptions of the Heisei Era Kamen Riders. The novel was scheduled to be released in 2020 but has since been delayed indefinitely.

Video game
, is the sixth installment of the Kamen Rider: Climax series, and was released on December 7, 2017 for PlayStation 4. It's a role-playing fighting game and featured characters from Kamen Rider Gaim to Kamen Rider Build. It's also the first Kamen Rider game to be localized in South East Asia & Korea regions.
 is a mobile city-building game. The Kamen Riders from Kamen Rider Build were featured in this game as playable characters.

Cast
: 
: 
: 
: 
: 
: 
: 
: 
: 
: 
: 
: 
: 
: 
: 
: 
: 
: 
: 
: 
: 
, Evol-Driver and Evol-Trigger Voices: 
: 
Build Driver, Nebula Steam Gun and Genius Fullbottle Voices: 
Sclash Driver, Crocodile Crack Fullbottle, Cross-Z Magma Knuckle, Great Cross-Z Dragon, Genius Fullbottle and Grease Blizzard Knuckle Voices: 
Narration:

Guest cast

: 
:

Theme songs
Opening theme
Be The One
Lyrics, Composition & Arrangement: Tetsuya Komuro, Daisuke Asakura
Artist: PANDORA feat. Beverly
Episodes: 2–11, 13–15, 18–37, 39–48
Episodes 1, 12, 16, 17, 38, and 49 do not feature the show's opening sequence. This song is used as the ending theme in episodes 1, 12, 38, and 49 and as an insert song in episodes 16, 17, and 39.

Insert themes
Ready Go!!
Lyrics: Mio Aoyama
Composition & Arrangement: ats-, Takehito Shimizu, Toru Watanabe
Artist: ats-, Takehito Shimizu & Toru Watanabe Feat. AXL21
Episodes: 27, 28
Burning My Soul
Lyrics: BOUNCEBACK
Composition & Arrangement: fo(u)r Scream
Artist: J-CROWN & TaKu from 1 FINGER
Episodes: 31, 32
Hiroyuki Takami, who played Masamune Dan from Kamen Rider Ex-Aid, made a cover of this song that was included in his album "GIMMICK ZONE".
Evolution
Lyrics: Kyasu Morizuki, Mio Aoyama
Composition & Arrangement: ats-, Takehito Shimizu, Toru Watanabe
Artist: ats-, Takehito Shimizu & Toru Watanabe Feat. AXL21
Episodes: 33
Build up
Lyrics: Chisato Akita
Composition & Arrangement: Kikuo Sato
Artist: Kamen Rider Girls
Episodes: 40, 41
Law of the Victory
Lyrics: Ricky
Composition: Koichi Terasawa 
Arrangement: Kikuo Sato
Artist: Rider Chips
Episodes: 44, 45

Release

Broadcast
Kamen Rider Build aired on TV Asahi's Super Hero Time Programming Block every Sunday from September 3, 2017 to August 26, 2018.

Home media
Kamen Rider Build was first released on DVD in 12 volumes in 2018. The series was also released on Blu-ray in 4 volumes in 2018. The Blu-ray collection also includes the spin-off miniseries ROGUE, with the behind the scenes for the miniseries being available in Volume 4. Kamen Rider Build Final Stage was officially recorded on October 13, 2018 and October 14, 2018 and released on DVD on February 6, 2019.

References

External links
Official website at TV Asahi
Official website at Toei Company

2017 Japanese television series debuts
2018 Japanese television series endings
Television series about alien visitations
Television series about multiple time paths
Fiction about amnesia
Dystopian television series
Human experimentation in fiction
Build
Television series about parallel universes
Transhumanism in television series
TV Asahi original programming